Liam Bailey is an English singer-songwriter from Nottingham. He is noted for his soul, reggae, and blues-influenced vocal style.

Career
In 2010, he released two solo EPs on Amy Winehouse's Lioness Records. Recorded entirely by Bailey and his guitar, the debut EP 2am Rough Tracks was released on 23 September, following its recording some weeks before.  The EP consisted of "Your Heart's Not Safe", "I'd Rather Go Blind" and "Please, Please, Please, Let Me Get What I Want". This was followed by a second three track EP So Down, Cold, released on 29 November, featuring the tracks; "Fool Boy", "Breaking Out" and "So Down, Cold". Bailey signed to Polydor Records earlier the same year.

Bailey has been performing around the world with Chase & Status since 2010. Bailey co-wrote & performed on their single Blind Faith, released on 21 January 2011 in the UK, where it debuted at number five in the charts; it also featured on their second album No More Idols. They then collaborated on the single Big Man, released 16 October 2012, which reached No. 13 on the UK Dance Chart and appears on some editions of follow-up album Brand New Machine.

Bailey's prospective debut album Out of the Shadows was recorded, produced by Salaam Remi, and scheduled for issue in September 2011 but Bailey unexpectedly pulled the release.

Following the break with Polydor, 2013 saw the re-release of "When Will They Learn" on Speakerbox, MistaJam's Ministry of Sound imprint, complete with remixes by Shadow Child and others. The video was shot with Bailey's friends in Nottingham for the relatively small sum of £1,750. Manager Sarah Stennett told HitQuarters that its homegrown, low-key nature was a perfect fit saying: "The video with Liam is amazing because his friends capture him so well. He was signed to a major label previously and they never quite captured it."

Bailey's collaboration with Shy FX, "Soon Come" reached No. 6 on the UK Indie Chart in August 2013 and received praise from David Rodigan, Zane Lowe, and Annie Mac. They also collaborated on an EP as "Project Maldonado" which was released for download on SoundCloud.

His debut album Definitely Now was released in the US in August 2014 on Flying Buddha/Sony, with download single On My Mind available with pre-order. In an interview with Wondering Sound, Bailey explains how "it's been torture trying to figure out which way to go" in terms of musical direction. 'Definitely Now' shows that he has now found his sound, and is described by Wondering Sound as "sweet Daptone soul infused with blues moods, Oasis riffage, Sam Cooke grooves and light Jamaican accents".

Nine years after first working together on The Dynamic Set's 'When Will They Learn' single, Liam Bailey and Big Crown boss Leon Michaels have finally recorded an album together. While that song was a retro reggae-soul treat, Ekundayo builds on the Nottingham singer-songwriter's penchant for recording lo-fi soul, in which his evocative and effortlessly soulful vocals rise above fuzzy, often homemade backing tracks that variously mix and match elements of roots reggae, digi-dub, dancehall, classic '70s soul and folk (see the 'Redemption Song'-esque 'Vixit'). The result is a vibrant, colourful and highly entertaining album made for purists and new heads alike.

Discography

Studio albums

EPs

Singles

As lead artist

Notes
  – The track was released as a free download from his website.

As featured artist

Other appearances

References

External links
 Liam Bailey on YouTube
 Liam Bailey video interview in the Virgin Red Room
 Line Of Best Fit interview, March 2011
 LeftLion interview, May 2011

1983 births
English male singers
English soul singers
British reggae singers
Living people
21st-century English singers
21st-century British male singers